North Korea competed at the 2017 World Championships in Athletics held in London, Great Britain, from 4–13 August 2017. The country was represented by three athletes, all of them runners taking part in the women's marathon event on 6 August. Kim Hye-gyong finished the highest, ranking 15th, with a season's best of 2:30:29. Jo Un-ok finished 29th and Kim Hye-song did not finish the race.

Results
(SB – season best)

Women

Track and road events

See also

Sport in North Korea
Women in North Korea

References

Nations at the 2017 World Championships in Athletics
World Championships in Athletics
North Korea at the World Championships in Athletics